Russell McCaskill Simpson (June 17, 1880 – December 12, 1959) was an American character actor.

Early life
Russell Simpson was born on June 17, 1880 (other sources indicate 1877) in Danville, California. He attended grammar school in the Danville District in Contra Costa County, California; he graduated on July 2, 1892. At age 18, Simpson prospected for gold in Alaska. He began taking acting classes in Seattle, Washington. He was married to Gertrude Aller from New York City on January 19, 1910.

Career
By 1909, he had gone into the theatre. He appeared in at least two plays on Broadway between 1909 and 1912, and made his motion picture debut in Cecil B. DeMille's 1914 original film version of The Virginian in a bit part.  By 1923, when the film was remade, Simpson had progressed to playing the lead villain.

Throughout his career, Simpson worked for 12 years in road shows, stock companies, and on Broadway. Simpson didn't usually perform lead roles, but he did star in many movies throughout the silent movie era. He did perform a lead role as the grandfather in Out of the Dust (1920) and the father in The First Auto (1927). 

Simpson is best known for his work in the films of John Ford and, in particular, for his portrayal of Pa Joad in The Grapes of Wrath in 1940. He was known for his "grizzled old man" appearances. Gaunt, lanky, and rustic-sounding, Simpson was a familiar character actor for almost forty-five years, particularly as a member of the John Ford Stock Company. He worked up to 1959, the year of his death. His final film was The Horse Soldiers, his tenth film for Ford. Simpson was the president of the Overseas Phonograph Accessories Corporation. He died on December 12, 1959, in Woodland Hills, California. Simpson had appeared in over 500 movies throughout his life.

Selected filmography

 The Old Homestead (1915) as Sheriff
 Lovely Mary (1916) as Peter Nelson
 The Feud Girl (1916) as Zeb Bassett
 The Barrier (1917) as John Gaylord / John Tale
 The Food Gamblers (1917) as Samuel Sloane
 Blue Jeans (1917) as Jacob Tutwiler
 A Weaver of Dreams (1918) as Martin Chandler
 Breakers Ahead (1918) as Captain Scudder
 Riders of the Night (1918) as Sally's Grandfather
 The Uphill Path (1918) as James Lawton
 The Border Legion (1918) as Overland Bradley
 Oh, Johnny! (1918) as Adele's Fatther
 The Challenge Accepted (1918) as Uncle Zeke Sawyer
 Fighting Cressy (1919) as Hiram McKinstry
 Desert Gold (1919) as Ladd
 The Deadlier Sex (1920) as Jim Willis
 Lahoma (1920) as Brick Willock
 The Branding Iron (1920) as John Carver
 Godless Men (1920) as 'Black' Pawl
 Bunty Pulls the Strings (1921) as Tammas Biggar
 Under the Lash (1921) as Simeon Krillet
 Shadows of Conscience (1921) as Jim Logan
 Across the Dead-Line (1922) as Enoch Kidder
 Fools of Fortune (1922) as Magpie Simpkins
 Human Hearts (1922) as Paul Logan
 Rags to Riches (1922) as The Sheriff
 Peg o' My Heart (1922) as Jim O'Connell
 The Kingdom Within (1922) as Caleb Deming
 Hearts Aflame (1923) as Black Joe
 The Girl of the Golden West (1923) as Jack Rance
 Circus Days (1923) as Eben Holt
 The Huntress (1923) as Big Jack Skinner
 Defying Destiny (1923) as Mr. Wilkens
 The Virginian (1923) as Trampas
 Desire (1923)
 Painted People (1924) as Fred Lane
 The Narrow Street (1925) as Gaarvey
 Beauty and the Bad Man (1925) as Chuckwalla Bill
 Old Shoes (1925)
 Paint and Powder (1925) as Riley
 Thunder Mountain (1925) as Si Pace
 The Splendid Road (1925) as Capt. Lightfoot
 The Ship of Souls (1925) as Angus Garth
 The Earth Woman (1926) as Ezra Tilden
 Rustling for Cupid (1926) as Hank Blatchford
 The Social Highwayman (1926) as The Mayor's Partner
 Lovey Mary (1926) as Stubbins
 God's Great Wilderness (1927) as Richard Stoner
 Annie Laurie (1927) as Sandy
 The Heart of the Yukon (1927) as 'Cash' Cynon
 The Frontiersman (1927) as Andrew Jackson
 The First Auto (1927) as Hank Armstrong
 Now We're in the Air (1927) as Lord Abercrombie McTavish
 Wild Geese (1927) as Caleb Gare
 The Trail of '98 (1928) as Old Swede (scenes deleted)
 Life's Mockery (1928) as Wolf Miller
 The Bushranger (1928) as Sir Eric
 Tropical Nights (1928) as Singapore Joe
 Noisy Neighbors (1929) as Ebenezer
 All Faces West (1929) as Gunner Bill
 Innocents of Paris (1929) as Emile Leval
 After the Fog (1929) as Joshua Barker
 The Lone Star Ranger (1930) as Colonel John Aldridge
 Abraham Lincoln (1930) as Lincoln's Employer
 Billy the Kid (1930) as Angus McSween
 Man to Man (1930) as Uncle Cal
 The Great Meadow (1931) as Thomas Hall
 Susan Lenox (Her Fall and Rise) (1931) as Doctor
 Ridin' for Justice (1932) as Marshal Joseph Slyde
 Law and Order (1932) as Judge R.W. Williams
 Lena Rivers (1932) as Grandfather Nichols
 The Riding Tornado (1932) as Sheriff
 The Famous Ferguson Case (1932) as Banker Craig
 The Honor of the Press (1932) as City Editor Dan Perkins
 Hello Trouble (1932) as Jonathan Kenyon
 Cabin in the Cotton (1932) as Uncle Joe
 Call Her Savage (1932) as Old Man in Wagon Train
 Silver Dollar (1932) as Hamlin
 Face in the Sky (1933) as Pa Nathan Brown
 Sixteen Fathoms Deep (1934) as A.B. Crockett
 Frontier Marshal (1934) as Editor Pickett
 Carolina (1934) as Richards
 Three on a Honeymoon (1934) as Ezra MacDuff
 Ever Since Eve (1934) as Jim Wood
 The World Moves On (1934) as Notary (1825)
 West of the Pecos (1934) as Roy Neal
 The County Chairman (1935) as Vance Jimmison
 The Hoosier Schoolmaster (1935) as Doc Small
 Motive for Revenge (1935) as McAllister
 Way Down East (1935) as Squire Amasa Bartlett
 Paddy O'Day (1936) as Benton
 Man Hunt (1936) as Jeff Parkington
 The Harvester (1936) as Abner Prewett
 Girl of the Ozarks (1936) as Bascomb Rogers
 San Francisco (1936) as Red Kelly
 The Crime of Dr. Forbes (1936) as Sheriff Neil
 Back to Nature (1936) as Sheriff (uncredited)
 Ramona (1936) as Scroggs
 Wild Brian Kent (1936) as Race Judge (uncredited)
 Green Light (1937) as Sheep Man
 Maid of Salem (1937) as Village Marshal (uncredited)
 Mountain Justice (1937) as Mr. Matthew Turnbull
 That I May Live (1937) as Bish Plivens
 Parnell (1937) as Dead Child's Father (uncredited)
 Yodelin' Kid from Pine Ridge (1937) as Bayliss Baynum
 Wild West Days (1937) as Matt Keeler
 Paradise Isle (1937) as Baxter
 Gold is Where You Find It (1938) as MacKenzie
 Valley of the Giants (1938) as McKenzie
 Heart of the North (1938) as Dave MacMillan
 Dodge City (1939) as Jack Orth
 Desperate Trails (1939) as Sheriff Big Bill Tanner
 Drums Along the Mohawk (1939) as Dr. Petry
 The Grapes of Wrath (1940) as Pa Joad
 Virginia City (1940) as Frank Gaylord
 Three Faces West (1940) as Minister
 Brigham Young (1940) as U.S. Army Major
 Tobacco Road (1941) as Chief of Police
 Citadel of Crime (1941) as Jess Meekins
 Bad Men of Missouri (1941) as Hank Younger
 Wild Geese Calling (1941) as Marshal Len Baker
 Last of the Duanes (1941) as Tom Duane
 Swamp Water (1941) as Marty McCord
 Nazi Agent (1942) as 2nd Captain (uncredited)
 Wild Bill Hickok Rides (1942) as Edward 'Ned' Nolan
 Shut My Big Mouth (1942) as Mayor Potter
 The Lone Star Ranger (1942) as Tom Duane
 The Spoilers (1942) as Flapjack Sims
 Tennessee Johnson (1942) as Kirby
 Border Patrol (1943) as Orestes Krebs
 Colt Comrades (1943) as Sheriff (uncredited)
 Moonlight in Vermont (1943) as Uncle Rufus
 The Woman of the Town (1943) as Sime
 Texas Masquerade (1944) as J.K. Trimble
 Man from Frisco (1944) as Dr. Hershey
 The Big Bonanza (1944) as Adam Parker
 Along Came Jones (1945) as Pop de Longpre
 Incendiary Blonde (1945) as Jenkins (uncredited)
 They Were Expendable (1945) as 'Dad' Knowland
 California Gold Rush (1946) as Colonel Parker
 Bad Bascomb (1946) as Elijah Walker
 Death Valley (1946) as Old Silas Bagley
 My Darling Clementine (1946) as John Simpson
 My Dog Shep (1946) as Matt Hodgkins
 A Boy and His Dog (1946, Short) as Mr. Thornycroft
 The Romance of Rosy Ridge (1947) as Dan Yeary
 Bowery Buckaroos (1947) as Sheriff Luke Barlow
 The Fabulous Texan (1947) as Wade Clayton
 Albuquerque (1948) as Abner Huggins
 Coroner Creek (1948) as Walt Hardison
 Tap Roots (1948) as Big Sam Dabney
 Sundown in Santa Fe (1948) as Sheriff Jim Wyatt
 Tuna Clipper (1949) as Capt. Fergus MacLennan
 The Gal Who Took the West (1949) as Bartender (as old Timer)
 Free for All (1949) as Farmer
 Wagon Master (1950) as Adam Perkins
 Saddle Tramp (1950) as Pop
 Call of the Klondike (1950) as Andy McKay
 Comin' Round the Mountain (1951) as Judge
 Lone Star (1952) as Senator Maynard Cole
 Ma and Pa Kettle at the Fair (1952) as Clem Johnson
 Feudin' Fools (1952) as Grandpa Smith
 Meet Me at the Fair (1953) as Sheriff Evans
 The Sun Shines Bright (1953) as Dr. Lewt Lake
 Seven Brides for Seven Brothers (1954) as Mr. Bixby
 Broken Lance (1954) as Judge (uncredited)
 The Last Command (1955) as The Parson
 The Brass Legend (1956) as Deputy 'Pop' Jackson
 The Tin Star (1957) as Clem Hall
 The Horse Soldiers (1959) as Sheriff Goodbody

References

External links

 
 
 
 Russell Simpson papers at L. Tom Perry Special Collections, Brigham Young University

1880 births
1959 deaths
20th-century American male actors
American male film actors
American male stage actors
American male silent film actors
Male Western (genre) film actors
Male actors from San Francisco
Burials at Forest Lawn Memorial Park (Glendale)
People from Danville, California